John Henry Oke (1 May 1880 – 8 March 1950) was an English professional golfer. He won the first Canadian Open in 1904. His brother, George (1892–1947), was also a professional golfer and was president of the PGA in 1930/31.

Oke was born in Northam, Devon near Royal North Devon Golf Club. By 1899 he was an assistant to J. H. Taylor at Mid-Surrey Golf Club. He entered the Open Championship from 1901 to 1903, finishing tied for 15th place in 1901 and tied for 29th in 1903. Oke was the professional at Royal Ottawa Golf Club in 1904 and 1905, during which time he won the first Canadian Open.

In 1906 Oke became the professional at Sutton Coldfield Golf Club, just north of Birmingham where he remained until moving to North Hants Golf Club in Fleet, Hampshire in 1912. During his period at Sutton Coldfield he was a regular competitor in tournaments. As well as playing in the Open Championship, he qualified for the final stages of the News of the World Match Play in 1906, 1907 and 1908 and was runner-up in the Midland Professional Championship in 1910 and 1911.

Oke left for the United States in April 1915 and played in the U.S. Open that year.  He remained in America until his death in 1950, from cancer of the throat. He held a number of posts before his retirement in 1948.

Professional wins (1)
Note: This list may be incomplete.

1904 Canadian Open

Results in major championships

Note: Oke never played in the Masters Tournament or the PGA Championship.

CUT = Missed the cut
"T" indicates a tie for a place

References

English male golfers
People from Northam, Devon
1880 births
1950 deaths